Events in the year 2004 in Japan.

2004 was the population "peak" of Japan—the last year in which the national population increased.

Incumbents
 Emperor: Akihito
 Prime Minister: Junichiro Koizumi (L–Kanagawa)
 Chief Cabinet Secretary: Yasuo Fukuda (L–Gunma) until May 7, Hiroyuki Hosoda (L–Shimane)
 Chief Justice of the Supreme Court: Akira Machida
 President of the House of Representatives: Yōhei Kōno (L–Kanagawa)
 President of the House of Councillors: Hiroyuki Kurata (L–Chiba) until July 30, Chikage Ōgi (L–proportional)
 Diet sessions: 159th (regular, January 19 to June 15), 160th (extraordinary, July 30 to August 6), 161st (October 12 to December 3)

Governors
Aichi Prefecture: Masaaki Kanda 
Akita Prefecture: Sukeshiro Terata 
Aomori Prefecture: Shingo Mimura
Chiba Prefecture: Akiko Dōmoto 
Ehime Prefecture: Moriyuki Kato 
Fukui Prefecture: Issei Nishikawa 
Fukuoka Prefecture: Wataru Asō 
Fukushima Prefecture: Eisaku Satō
Gifu Prefecture: Taku Kajiwara 
Gunma Prefecture: Hiroyuki Kodera 
Hiroshima Prefecture: Yūzan Fujita 
Hokkaido: Harumi Takahashi
Hyogo Prefecture: Toshizō Ido
Ibaraki Prefecture: Masaru Hashimoto 
Ishikawa Prefecture: Masanori Tanimoto
Iwate Prefecture: Hiroya Masuda 
Kagawa Prefecture: Takeki Manabe 
Kagoshima Prefecture: Tatsurō Suga (until 27 July); Satoshi Mitazono (starting 27 July)
Kanagawa Prefecture: Shigefumi Matsuzawa 
Kochi Prefecture: Daijiro Hashimoto 
Kumamoto Prefecture: Yoshiko Shiotani 
Kyoto Prefecture: Keiji Yamada 
Mie Prefecture: Akihiko Noro 
Miyagi Prefecture: Shirō Asano 
Miyazaki Prefecture: Tadahiro Ando 
Nagano Prefecture: Yasuo Tanaka 
Nagasaki Prefecture: Genjirō Kaneko 
Nara Prefecture: Yoshiya Kakimoto
Niigata Prefecture: Ikuo Hirayama (until 24 October); Hirohiko Izumida (starting 25 October)
Oita Prefecture: Katsusada Hirose
Okayama Prefecture: Masahiro Ishii 
Okinawa Prefecture: Keiichi Inamine
Osaka Prefecture: Fusae Ōta 
Saga Prefecture: Yasushi Furukawa 
Saitama Prefecture: Kiyoshi Ueda 
Shiga Prefecture: Yoshitsugu Kunimatsu 
Shiname Prefecture: Nobuyoshi Sumita 
Shizuoka Prefecture: Yoshinobu Ishikawa 
Tochigi Prefecture: Akio Fukuda (until 8 December); Tomikazu Fukuda (starting 9 December)
Tokushima Prefecture: Kamon Iizumi
Tokyo: Shintarō Ishihara 
Tottori Prefecture: Yoshihiro Katayama 
Toyama Prefecture: Yutaka Nakaoki (until 8 November); Takakazu Ishii (starting 9 November)
Wakayama Prefecture: Yoshiki Kimura 
Yamagata Prefecture: Kazuo Takahashi 
Yamaguchi Prefecture: Sekinari Nii 
Yamanashi Prefecture: Takahiko Yamamoto

Events

January
 January 19: Deployment of Japanese troops to Iraq begins as the first set of ground forces arrive in Samawah.

February
 February 8: The Ground Self-Defense Force's main unit of the SDF dispatched to Iraq enters Samawah, Iraq.
 February 12: The Tokyo District Court has ruled two years in prison and five years in prison for former member of the House of Representatives Kiyomi Tsujimoto who was accused of fraudulent misappropriation of secretary salary. Neither the prosecution nor the defendant appealed, and the ruling was finalized on March 26.
 February 17: Avian influenza virus infection in pet chicken (chabo) was confirmed in Kokonoe-cho, Oita Prefecture (the second case this year following Yamaguchi).
 February 27: Aum Shinrikyo leader Shoko Asahara is given the death penalty.

March
 March 4: Famed Yomiuri Giants manager Shigeo Nagashima is hospitalized.
 March 13: First segment of the Kyushu Shinkansen opens.
 March 17: Tokyo District Court issues an injunction halting the sale of Bungei Shunju issues due to a breach of privacy suit by Makiko Tanaka.
 March 24: Chinese activists land in the Senkaku Islands and are arrested by Okinawan police.
 March 30: Nurse Daisuke Mori is sentenced to life imprisonment.

April
 April 1
Japan Airlines and Japan Air System merge.
New Tokyo International Airport is privatized and renamed Narita International Airport.
Teito Rapid Transit Authority becomes Tokyo Metro.
 April 7: Three Japanese civilians taken hostage in Iraq.
 April 8: Economist and graduate school professor Kazuhide Uekusa is arrested for trying to peep under a schoolgirl's skirt on the escalator of JR Shinagawa Station.

May
 May 10
Winny developer Isamu Kaneko, assistant instructor at Tokyo University, is arrested on charges of contributory copyright infringement.
Crown Prince Naruhito denounces palace officials at a press conference, suggesting that Crown Princess Masako is physically and mentally sick.
 May 22: Prime Minister Junichiro Koizumi visits Pyongyang to bring back 5 Japanese youths who were born while their parents were hostages in North Korea.

June
 June 1: An 11-year-old girl kills her classmate at a Sasebo elementary school.

July
 July 1: Sacred Sites and Pilgrimage Routes in the Kii Mountain Range enlisted as a world heritage site.
 July 8: Naha District Court in Okinawa sentences US Marine Major Michael Brown to a suspended one-year prison term on charge of attempted rape against a Filipina.
 July 11: In elections for the Upper House. the LDP suffers a small setback.
 July 18: Heavy rain disaster, re-dike collapse and sediment collapse in Fukui, Sanjō, Niigata and Tadami, Fukushima, resulting to 20 persons fatalities.
 July 21: Koizumi meets Roh Moo-hyun at Jeju Island in South Korea.
 July 30: Chikage Ogi becomes the first female Speaker of the House of Councillors.

August
 August 9: An obsolete steam pipe at Mihama Nuclear Plant blows up, killing four workers.

September
 September 3: World Rally Championship held in Japan for the first time.
 September 8: Typhoon Songda hit in western Honshu area, according to official document figure, 45 person fatalities, with injures 1324. 
 September 17: Japanese baseball players announce a weekend strike, the first baseball strike in Japanese history.
 September 27: Koizumi reshuffles his cabinet.
 September 29–30: Typhoon Meari, according to Fire and Disaster Management Agency official confirmed report, 27 persons were human fatalities and 95 persons wounded.

October

 October 20: Typhoon Tokage makes landfall in Japan.
 October 23: The Chūetsu earthquake strikes Niigata Prefecture, causing widespread damage to the area.

November
 November 1: Bank of Japan issues new 10,000, 5,000 and 1,000-yen banknotes.
 November 2: Japan's first new professional baseball franchise in 50 years is awarded to the Tohoku Rakuten Golden Eagles.

December
 December 24: Fukuoka Daiei Hawks are sold to SoftBank and become the Fukuoka SoftBank Hawks.
 December 26: 37 Japanese citizens are among the thousands of people died in the 2004 Indian Ocean earthquake and tsunami. The Japanese victims are affected in countries, such as Thailand, Indonesia, India, Sri Lanka, and the Maldives.

Births
 May 4: Kanon Tani, actress
 June 1: Miyu Honda, child actress 
 June 16: Shota Taguchi, actor.
 June 17: Fuku Suzuki, child actor
 June 23: Mana Ashida, child actress
 September 25: Seiran Kobayashi, actress

Deaths
 January 1: Isao Tamagawa, actor
 January 24: Tomio Aoki, actor
 February 2: Michio Hikitsuchi, aikido instructor
 February 6: Masataka Ida, soldier
 February 11: Hitoshi Takagi voice actor
 March 5: Masanori Tokita, football player
 March 20: Chosuke Ikariya, comedian and film actor
 April 15: Mitsuteru Yokoyama, manga artist (b. 1934)
 April 21: Den Fujita, president of McDonald's Japan
 May 21: Toshikazu Kase, civil servant and career diplomat
 July 19: Zenkō Suzuki, politician, Prime minister
 July 26: Ramo Nakajima, novelist
 September 14: Mamoru Takuma, murderer (executed)
 October 7: Miki Matsubara, singer, lyricist and composer
 November 6: Kensaburo Hara, politician
 November 17: Ariyama Kaede, murder victim
 November 24: Taiji Kase, master of Shotokan karate
 November 26: Shōgo Shimada, actor
 December 18: Kikuko, Princess Takamatsu

Statistics
 GDP: ¥504 trillion (+1.4%)
 Nikkei 225: High 12,163.89; low 10,365.40
 Wealthiest person in Japan: Nobutada Saji (net worth US$6.9 billion)
 Yen: High ¥101.83/USD; low ¥114.80/USD

See also
 2004 in Japanese television
 List of Japanese films of 2004

References

 
Years of the 21st century in Japan
Japan
Japan